Enerhiya Nova Kakhovka was a Ukrainian professional football team from Nova Kakhovka in Kherson oblast. The club competed in the Ukrainian Second League since 2010.

History

The club was founded in 1952 on the basis of worker's collective on the hydroelectrical station that is on the Dnipro River (Kakhovka Hydroelectric Power Plant). Between 1957-1991, the club was administered by the local Electrical Machine Works.

As club has won the regional oblast championship of Kherson 17 times and 15 times were Oblast Cup champions.

From 1967 to 1971, the club participated in the Soviet professional competitions in the Ukrainian Class B Division until they were phased away.

In their debut as professionals in the season of 2010–11 the club was amongst the leaders.

In April 2022 interview Enerhiya manager Eduard Khavrov announced the dissolution of the club since 1 April 2022 due to Russian occupation of Nova Kakhovka during 2022 Russian invasion of Ukraine.

Honours
 Ukrainian Amateur Football competitions (Soviet/Ukrainian Lower Tier)
  1964, 1972
  1979, 1984
 Ukrainian Amateur Cup
  1979, 1982
  1980, 1983

Players

League and cup history

Soviet Union

{|class="wikitable"
|-bgcolor="#efefef"
! Season
! Div.
! Pos.
! Pl.
! W
! D
! L
! GS
! GA
! P
!Domestic Cup
!colspan=2|Europe
!Notes
|- bgcolor=SteelBlue
|align=center|1954
|align=center|Rep
|align=center|4/6
|align=center|10
|align=center|4
|align=center|1
|align=center|5
|align=center|14
|align=center|16
|align=center|9
|align=center|
|align=center|
|align=center|
|align=center|
|- bgcolor=SteelBlue
|align=center|1955
|align=center|Rep
|align=center|4/8
|align=center|14
|align=center|7
|align=center|1
|align=center|6
|align=center|20
|align=center|24
|align=center|15
|align=center|
|align=center|
|align=center|
|align=center|as Enerhiya Kakhovka
|- bgcolor=SteelBlue
|align=center|1956
|align=center|Rep
|align=center|7/8
|align=center|14
|align=center|3
|align=center|2
|align=center|9
|align=center|11
|align=center|48
|align=center|8
|align=center|
|align=center|
|align=center|
|align=center|
|- bgcolor=SteelBlue
|align=center|1957
|align=center|Rep
|align=center|6/6
|align=center|10
|align=center|0
|align=center|1
|align=center|9
|align=center|4
|align=center|34
|align=center|1
|align=center|
|align=center|
|align=center|
|align=center|
|-
|align=center|1958
|align=center colspan=13|
|- bgcolor=SteelBlue
|align=center|1959
|align=center|Rep
|align=center|6/8
|align=center|14
|align=center|4
|align=center|5
|align=center|5
|align=center|19
|align=center|29
|align=center|13
|align=center|
|align=center|
|align=center|
|align=center|
|-
|align=center|1960–1963
|align=center colspan=13|regional competitions
|- bgcolor=SteelBlue
|align=center rowspan=2|1964
|align=center rowspan=2|4th
|align=center|1/4
|align=center|6
|align=center|4
|align=center|1
|align=center|1
|align=center|8
|align=center|3
|align=center|9
|align=center|
|align=center|
|align=center|
|align=center|
|- bgcolor=SteelBlue
|align=center|1/6
|align=center|5
|align=center|4
|align=center|0
|align=center|1
|align=center|8
|align=center|3
|align=center|8
|align=center|
|align=center|
|align=center|
|align=center|
|- bgcolor=SteelBlue
|align=center|1965
|align=center|4th
|align=center|3/5
|align=center|8
|align=center|2
|align=center|3
|align=center|3
|align=center|9
|align=center|10
|align=center|7
|align=center|
|align=center|
|align=center|
|align=center|
|- bgcolor=SteelBlue
|align=center|1966
|align=center|4th
|align=center|2/5
|align=center|8
|align=center|6
|align=center|1
|align=center|1
|align=center|16
|align=center|4
|align=center|13
|align=center|
|align=center|
|align=center|
|align=center bgcolor=lightgreen|Admitted
|- bgcolor=PowderBlue
|align=center|1967
|align=center|3rd
|align=center|18/21
|align=center|40
|align=center|9
|align=center|14
|align=center|17
|align=center|24
|align=center|41
|align=center|32
|align=center|
|align=center|
|align=center|
|align=center|
|- bgcolor=PowderBlue
|align=center|1968
|align=center|3rd
|align=center|15/22
|align=center|42
|align=center|12
|align=center|14
|align=center|16
|align=center|32
|align=center|39
|align=center|38
|align=center|
|align=center|
|align=center|
|align=center|
|- bgcolor=PowderBlue
|align=center|1969
|align=center|3rd
|align=center|16/21
|align=center|40
|align=center|9
|align=center|16
|align=center|15
|align=center|27
|align=center|33
|align=center|34
|align=center|
|align=center|
|align=center|
|align=center|
|- bgcolor=PowderBlue
|align=center|1970
|align=center|3rd 
|align=center|18/27
|align=center|40
|align=center|16
|align=center|9
|align=center|15
|align=center|43
|align=center|43
|align=center|41
|align=center|
|align=center|
|align=center|
|align=center bgcolor=pink|tier disbanded
|- bgcolor=SteelBlue
|align=center|1971
|align=center|4th
|align=center|2/6
|align=center|10
|align=center|6
|align=center|3
|align=center|1
|align=center|23
|align=center|5
|align=center|15
|align=center|
|align=center|
|align=center|
|align=center|
|- bgcolor=SteelBlue
|align=center rowspan=2|1972
|align=center rowspan=2|4th
|align=center|1/8
|align=center|14
|align=center|9
|align=center|3
|align=center|2
|align=center|27
|align=center|10
|align=center|21
|align=center|
|align=center|
|align=center|
|align=center|
|- bgcolor=SteelBlue
|align=center|1/6
|align=center|5
|align=center|3
|align=center|1
|align=center|1
|align=center|9
|align=center|3
|align=center|7
|align=center|
|align=center|
|align=center|
|align=center|
|- bgcolor=SteelBlue
|align=center|1973
|align=center|4th
|align=center|4/8
|align=center|14
|align=center|6
|align=center|3
|align=center|5
|align=center|24
|align=center|20
|align=center|15
|align=center|
|align=center|
|align=center|
|align=center|
|- bgcolor=SteelBlue
|align=center|1974
|align=center|4th
|align=center|7/8
|align=center|14
|align=center|2
|align=center|3
|align=center|9
|align=center|14
|align=center|26
|align=center|7
|align=center|
|align=center|
|align=center|
|align=center|
|}

Ukraine

{|class="wikitable"
|-bgcolor="#efefef"
! Season
! Div.
! Pos.
! Pl.
! W
! D
! L
! GS
! GA
! P
!Domestic Cup
!colspan=2|Europe
!Notes
|- bgcolor=SteelBlue
|align=center|2010
|align=center|4th
|align=center|3/5
|align=center|8
|align=center|3
|align=center|2
|align=center|3
|align=center|10
|align=center|9
|align=center|11
|align=center|
|align=center|
|align=center|
|align=center bgcolor=lightgreen|Admitted
|-bgcolor=PowderBlue
|align=center|2010–11
|align=center|3rd "A"
|align=center bgcolor=tan|3/12
|align=center|22
|align=center|13
|align=center|5
|align=center|4
|align=center|38
|align=center|17
|align=center|44
|align=center| finals 
|align=center|
|align=center|
|align=center|
|-bgcolor=PowderBlue
|align=center|2011–12
|align=center|3rd "A"
|align=center|4/14
|align=center|26
|align=center|15
|align=center|7
|align=center|4
|align=center|50
|align=center|17
|align=center|52
|align=center| finals 
|align=center|
|align=center|
|align=center|
|-bgcolor=PowderBlue
|align=center rowspan=2|2012–13
|align=center|3rd "B"
|align=center|10/13
|align=center|24
|align=center|5
|align=center|6
|align=center|13
|align=center|25
|align=center|50
|align=center|21
|align=center rowspan=2| finals 
|align=center|
|align=center|
|align=center|
|-bgcolor=PowderBlue
|align=center|3rd "3"
|align=center|1/4
|align=center|6
|align=center|6
|align=center|0
|align=center|0
|align=center|14
|align=center|3
|align=center|18
|align=center|
|align=center|
|align=center|Stage 2
|-bgcolor=PowderBlue
|align=center|2013–14
|align=center|3rd
|align=center|16/19
|align=center|36
|align=center|9
|align=center|4
|align=center|23
|align=center|38
|align=center|85
|align=center|31
| align="center" | finals 
|align=center|
|align=center|
|align=center|
|-bgcolor=PowderBlue
|align=center|2014–15
|align=center|3rd "B"
|align=center|10/10
|align=center|27
|align=center|4
|align=center|3
|align=center|20
|align=center|25
|align=center|69
|align=center|15
| align="center" | finals 
|align=center|
|align=center|
|align=center|
|-bgcolor=PowderBlue
|align=center|2015–16
|align=center|3rd "B"
|align=center|9/14
|align=center|26
|align=center|10
|align=center|3
|align=center|13
|align=center|31
|align=center|38
|align=center|33
| align="center" | finals 
|align=center|
|align=center|
|align=center|
|-bgcolor=PowderBlue
|align=center|2016–17
|align=center|3rd "B"
|align=center|8/17
|align=center|32 	
|align=center|14 	
|align=center|6 	
|align=center|12 	
|align=center|62 	
|align=center|46 	
|align=center|48
| align="center" | finals 
|align=center|
|align=center|
|align=center|
|-bgcolor=PowderBlue
|align=center|2017–18
|align=center|3rd "B"
|align=center bgcolor=tan|3/12
|align=center|33  
|align=center|19  	
|align=center|4  	
|align=center|10  
|align=center|67  	 	
|align=center|32
|align=center|61
| align="center" | finals 
|align=center|
|align=center|
|align=center|
|-bgcolor=PowderBlue
|align=center|2018–19
|align=center|3rd "B"
|align=center|6/10
|align=center| 27 	
|align=center| 8 	
|align=center| 7 	
|align=center| 12 	
|align=center|	26 	
|align=center|31 	 	
|align=center|31
| align="center" | finals 
|align=center|
|align=center|
|align=center|
|-bgcolor=PowderBlue
| align="center" |2019–20
| align="center" |3rd "B"
| align="center" |5/11
| align="center" |20
| align="center" |6
| align="center" |7
| align="center" |7
| align="center" |25
| align="center" |26
| align="center" |25
| align="center" | finals 
| align="center" |
| align="center" |
| align="center" |
|-bgcolor=PowderBlue
| align="center" |2020–21
| align="center" |3rd "B"
| align="center" |5/12
| align="center" |22
| align="center" |9
| align="center" |3
| align="center" |10
| align="center" |34
| align="center" |35
| align="center" |30
| align="center" | finals
| align="center" |
| align="center" |
| align="center" |
|-bgcolor=PowderBlue
| align="center" |2021–22
| align="center" |3rd "B"
| align="center" |13/16
| align="center" |20
| align="center" |5
| align="center" |2
| align="center" |13
| align="center" |20
| align="center" |40
| align="center" |17
| align="center" | finals
| align="center" |
| align="center" |
| align="center" bgcolor=lightgrey|Withdrew
|}

References

External links
  Official website

 
Ukrainian Second League clubs
Defunct football clubs in Kherson Oblast
Nova Kakhovka
Association football clubs established in 1952
Association football clubs disestablished in 2022
1952 establishments in Ukraine
2022 disestablishments in Ukraine
Football clubs in the Ukrainian Soviet Socialist Republic